Nan Provincial Administrative Organization Stadium or Nan Province Stadium is a multi-purpose stadium in Nan Province, Thailand. It is currently used mostly for football matches and is the home stadium of Nan F.C. The stadium holds 2,500 people.

Football venues in Thailand
Multi-purpose stadiums in Thailand
Buildings and structures in Nan province
Sport in Nan province